The 2014 Vanderbilt Commodores football team represented Vanderbilt University during the 2014 NCAA Division I FBS football season. The Commodores played their eight home games at Vanderbilt Stadium at Dudley Field in Nashville, Tennessee, which has been Vanderbilt football's home stadium since 1922. Derek Mason took over the helm as Vanderbilt's new head coach. They were members of the Eastern Division of the Southeastern Conference (SEC). They finished the season 3–9, 0–8 in SEC play to finish in last place in the Eastern Division.

Coaching staff

Recruiting

Schedule
In 2014 Vanderbilt played eight home games; the Ole Miss game was played at LP Field, but it was considered a Vandy home game. Their first four games were at home. Vanderbilt played at Kentucky (Lexington, Kentucky), Georgia (Athens, Georgia), Missouri (Columbia, Missouri), and at Mississippi State (Starkville, Mississippi). Also Vandy played four non-conference teams at home against Temple, UMass, Charleston Southern, and Old Dominion.

Game summaries

Temple
The Derek Mason era got off to a bad start as his mistake-prone Commodores were outscored 37-7 in a loss to visiting Temple at home. It was the worst defeat in a home opener in Vanderbilt program history, and the worst opening game loss since 1998 a 42-0 loss to Mississippi. The Commodores had seven turnovers, leading to 27 points for Temple.

Ole Miss
With a bad loss to Ole Miss Vandy had the worst start since 1998. In 1998 they lost to Ole Miss 42-0 and Alabama 32-7 to start the season. Also in 1998 Vanderbilt started with a six straight losses and ended the 1997 season with five straight losses to complete an eleven-game losing streak.

UMass

South Carolina

Kentucky

Georgia

Charleston Southern

Missouri

Old Dominion

Florida

Mississippi State

Tennessee

References

Vanderbilt
Vanderbilt Commodores football seasons
Vanderbilt Commodores football